Incident at Phantom Hill is a 1966 American Techniscope Western film directed by Earl Bellamy and starring Robert Fuller, Jocelyn Lane, Dan Duryea and Tom Simcox.

The story involves a Union gold shipment, which is stolen and buried in the desert. Both Union and rebel forces struggle to find it while threatened by the Comanche. A romance complicates the action.

Plot
At the end of the American Civil War, a group of Southern rebels steal a Union shipment of gold and bury it in a cave near an area known as Phantom Hill, Texas. After they are captured by Union forces, their leader secretly makes a deal with the army to reveal the gold's location in return for his release; a release based on a pardon promised him by the Confederate States of America at the beginning of the Civil War.

An army captain and four other men are given the job of accompanying the rebel on the journey to locate the gold. As the men are getting ready to leave, they are compelled to take with them a woman who is essentially being ordered out of town.  She and the captain are attracted to each other, though initially the relationship is not warm.

Phantom Hill is located on land newly-assigned to the Comanche and the group must deal with hostilities from them.  Eventually, after the gold is located, the rebel gets one of the group drunk, kills him and steals his gun. He kills another man, then escapes with the group's weaponry, the wagon filled with the gold, and the woman. The remaining men, without guns, must again face the Comanche. After this confrontation, only the captain and one other remain alive. They set off in pursuit of the rebel.

Enjoying some unexpected luck, the two arrive ahead of the rebel and the woman at a location important to all of them, due to their need of water. A short pursuit occurs which ends when the woman tosses a rifle to the captain, who kills the rebel. The three survivors begin the return trek to deliver the gold to the American government.

Cast
As appearing in order of screen credits (main roles identified):
 Robert Fuller as Matt Martin
 Jocelyn Lane as Memphis
 Dan Duryea as Joe Barlow
 Tom Simcox as Adam Long
 Linden Chiles as Dr. Hanneford
 Claude Akins as Krausman
 Noah Beery Jr. as O'Rourke (as Noah Beery)
 Paul Fix as General Hood
 Denver Pyle as 1st Hunter
 William Phipps as Trader
 Don Collier as SDrum
 Mickey Finn as 2nd Hunter

See also
 List of American films of 1966

References

External links
 
 
 

1966 films
1966 Western (genre) films
American Civil War films
American Western (genre) films
1960s English-language films
Films directed by Earl Bellamy
Universal Pictures films
Films scored by Hans J. Salter
1966 drama films
1960s American films